Valley Metro Bus is a  transit bus system for public transport in Maricopa County, Arizona, United States. Buses are operated by private companies contracted by Valley Metro and the City of Phoenix. Service currently operates throughout the broader Phoenix Metropolitan Area. All buses have wheelchair ramps or lifts, and except for paratransit vehicles, all buses have bike racks.

Operations 
There are over 100 bus routes contracted by Valley Metro, including regular routes, limited-stop routes, and community circulators. Bus frequency, hours, and days of operation vary by route. The most heavily used routes have peak service frequency of every 10 minutes and run as late as 3:30 am, while less used routes run every 30 minutes off-peak, with service ending at midnight.

Route types and naming conventions 

There are currently 60 local bus routes that form Valley Metro's super-grid bus system. They are numbered roughly according to the address on the Phoenix area's street grid on which they travel. For example:
 Route 35 is a north–south route which runs along 35th Avenue, which is the 3500 block, west, on the street grid.
 Route 0 runs north–south along Central Avenue, which is the dividing street or "zero point" separating east and west Phoenix on the street grid.
 Route 50 runs east–west along Camelback Road, which is the 5000 block, north, on the street grid
 Route 72 runs north–south along Scottsdale and Rural Roads, which are the 7200 block, east, on the street grid.
 Route 104 runs north–south along Alma School Road, which corresponds to the 10400 block, east, on the street grid (but not in the city of Mesa itself, which uses a different street numbering/zero point origin from the city of Phoenix).
 Routes 7 and 8 each run on 7th Street and 7th Avenue respectively.  Given that Phoenix has numbered thoroughfares designated as "Avenues" west of Central and "Streets" east of Central, Route 8 is one digit higher to avoid confusion with Route 7 which are both the 700 blocks.
 Route 17 runs east–west along McDowell Road, which actually is the 1600 block, north, on the street grid.  Route 17 is one digit higher to avoid confusion with Route 16, which runs north–south along 16th Street which is the 1600 block, east, on the street grid.

The community circulator routes are mostly a free service, the exceptions being the Avondale Zoom routes with a 50 cent fare each; formerly the Glendale Urban Shuttle (GUS) routes had a 25 cent fare each to ride; this fare was eliminated on October 23, 2017. They supplement the standard grid service with routes that connect neighborhoods to nearby business districts. Circulator vehicles are typically minibusses, with the Avondale Zoom routes, Scottsdale Trolley routes, and select Tempe Orbit routes using mid-size buses and the DASH circulator serving Downtown Phoenix using 40-foot buses. The naming convention varies by the communities they serve, such as the Scottsdale Neighborhood Trolley, Tempe Orbit Jupiter, and Phoenix SMART.

The LINK routes were limited-stop, streamlined bus connections to transit centers served by Valley Metro Rail. These routes used upgraded bus shelters that have LED "Next Bus" signs and bus rapid transit-styled vehicles with traffic signal priority. They were named after the street they travel on. The two routes were the Main Street LINK and the Arizona Avenue LINK.  LINK service was discontinued on October 24, 2016, and was replaced by enhanced local service on Routes 40 and 112.

The six RAPID routes are limited-stop commuter routes in the city of Phoenix that travel from Park and Ride lots in outlying neighborhoods near major freeways to RAPID stops in the downtown business core. These routes are mostly named for the freeway on which they travel, such as RAPID I-10 East and South Mountain RAPID routes (two routes connect newly developed neighborhoods along Baseline Road with downtown via Central Avenue). They are unidirectional, traveling toward downtown in the morning and out of downtown in the afternoons. These routes use NABI 45C-LFW suburban buses with a special paint scheme.

The express routes are also limited-stop commuter routes. They operate similarly to the RAPID routes, from outlying Park and Ride lots and pick-up points in suburban areas outside the city of Phoenix, with higher fares than standard routes, but the same as RAPID routes. They are numbered in the 500s, with the second digit indicating the area they serve, using the following scheme:
51x – Scottsdale
52x – Tempe
53x – Mesa and Gilbert
54x – Chandler
56x – Southwest Valley (Avondale, Goodyear, Buckeye, and Tolleson)
57x – Northwest Valley (Glendale, Peoria, Surprise, and Sun Cities)

These routes use a mix of bus types, ranging from transit-style buses with hard seats to "semi-suburban" buses (with highback, non-reclining seats) to full suburban buses (with a single door, luggage racks, and personal reading lights). These routes are also unidirectional, traveling into downtown Phoenix in the morning (using the major freeways after traveling on surface streets for part of the trip) and out of downtown in the afternoons.

Route list 

Routes marked with an asterisk (*) are a part of the Frequent Bus Network (15 minute-or-better headways on weekdays from 6 a.m. to 6 p.m.)

Color key:

Note that the listed facility assignments for Transdev-Phoenix operated routes are normal assignments, however, routes normally operated from the South facility may occasionally be substituted with buses from the North facility and vice versa.

Transit centers 
Valley Metro Bus serves the following transit centers:
 19th Ave and Montebello Transit Center, Phoenix
 Arrowhead Transit Center, Glendale
 Central Station, Phoenix
 Chandler Fashion Center Transit Center, Chandler
 Desert Sky Transit Center, Phoenix
 Ed Pastor Transit Center, Phoenix
 Gilbert Rd/Main St Transit Center, Mesa
 Main St and Sycamore Transit Center, Mesa
 Metrocenter Transit Center, Phoenix
 Mustang Transit Center, Scottsdale
 Paradise Valley Mall Transit Center, Phoenix
 Skysong Transit Center, Scottsdale
 Sunnyslope Transit Center, Phoenix
 Superstition Springs Transit Center
 Tempe Transportation Center, Tempe

Customer service 
The Transit Book (known until December 2008 as the Bus Book, and mentioned above) is updated twice yearly and contains maps and schedules for all routes. Copies are available at no charge at Valley Metro ticket offices, many public libraries, community colleges, and other civic facilities around the metropolitan area, and on the buses themselves. Because the Transit Book is difficult to carry around easily (the size is similar to a medium-sized catalog, averaging about 250 pages), patrons often use it to quickly reference the time when their next bus will arrive and simply leave the book sitting at their bus stop when finished, for the use of other riders.

Additionally, route schedules are posted at most bus stops in Tempe, selected bus stops in Scottsdale and Glendale, and at major transit centers in the city of Phoenix and throughout the Valley. On RAPID routes, schedules are electronic and are based on real-time information.

An automated next scheduled arrival service, NextRide, provides future arrival times for routes that serve a bus stop or light rail station. Each bus stop and light rail station has a five-digit "STOP#" found on a sign affixed to the bus stop sign post, shelter, or rail station. By calling the customer service number or by sending a text message, the passenger will be provided with the next three scheduled arrival times. If it is within 15 minutes of a scheduled arrival, a real-time estimate of when the bus or train will arrive will be provided, based on the vehicle's current location along the route.

A customer service call center is operated for passengers to plan their bus trips with the assistance of either an automated voice response system or a live customer service representative. The Valley Metro website  also has an online trip planning function, and includes all schedules and maps featured in the Transit Book; since 2006, Valley Metro is relying more on the website to post schedule information and is printing fewer paper copies of the Transit Book.

Passenger information systems 
Like most major cities, all buses (except for the non-Phoenix circulator vehicles) include the Route Scout on-board passenger information system, which includes a lighted marquee displaying the correct date and time, and an audio and visual Stop Requested announcement. Automatic Voice Annunciation (AVA) for audio and visual announcements for each major intersection, as well as minor cross streets.

Previously, these were voiced by longtime Phoenix radio personality, Liz Boyle  , however, these prerecorded announcements are slowly being phased out in favor of speech synthesis, to allow for easier updates. This same system is used by the LA Metro fleet and was introduced on the 2004 New Flyer D60LF buses.

Valley Metro Rail vehicles feature a similar passenger information system that uses speech synthesis technology, rather than a recorded voice, to announce approaching stations and give other travel-related announcements. Train operators may also use the vehicle's public address system at their discretion.

The RAPID bus stops as well as the former LINK bus stops include a display with real-time predictions for the next arrival at that stop. Additionally, all Valley Metro Rail platforms feature annunciation for the approximate arrival of the next train, while also allowing for messages regarding potential delays and general service information.

Valley Metro service providers

Unification of Tempe bus operations with the RPTA 
In 2012, the City of Tempe introduced a proposal that would unify its transit operations with the RPTA.  Under the new agreement, all Tempe bus operations would be handed over to the RPTA, where the Tempe transit facility would be utilized by the RPTA to reduce costs and improve efficiencies for certain routes by reducing deadheads due to its more central location than the existing RPTA facility in Mesa.

On November 24, 2012, the City of Tempe agreed to move forward with unifying its transit operations with the RPTA.  The contract for both agencies was initially planned to be awarded to First Transit on December 13, 2012, however, Veolia Transport protested the award because First Transit wasn't releasing information of where their cost savings would come from.  The protest was denied and the contract was officially awarded to First Transit on January 24, 2013.

Bus fleet 
Valley Metro and member cities maintain a growing fleet of over 800 vehicles for public bus routes and nearly 200 for paratransit.

References 

Transdev
Valley Metro